Meet the Frasers is an American reality television series that premiered January 13, 2020, and airs on E!. The series chronicles the lives of psychic medium Matt Fraser and his pageant queen girlfriend, Alexa Papigiotis.

Cast
Matt Fraser
Alexa Papigiotis
Angela Fraser, Matt's mother
Rod Fraser, Matt's father
Maria Fraser, Matt's younger sister
Sharon Ciolli, Alexa's mom
Anthony Ciolli, Alexa and Ava's stepfather
Ava Papigiotis, Alexa's younger sister

Episodes

References

2020s American reality television series
2020 American television series debuts
2020 American television series endings
E! original programming
English-language television shows